Eliakim is a moshav in Israel.

Eliakim may also refer to:

Eliakim, son of Hilkiah
Eliakim, son of Abiud, an ancestor of Saint Joseph
Eliakim, son of Melea, an ancestor of Saint Joseph
Jehoiakim, who was born Eliakim